Here is a classification of the most notable recipients of Order of the Three Stars, the highest order of the Republic of Latvia.

Chronology of recipients

Commander Grand Cross (with Chain): Pre-World War II (1924–1940)

Commander Grand Cross (with Chain): Modern era (since 1994)

Grand  Officer

By regime and country

Monarchies

Republics

International V.I.P.s

References 

List of recipients of the Order of the Three Stars 1994–2004
List of recipients of the Order of the Three Stars since 2004 (.doc file)

Recipients